Jason Roach (born ), also known by the nicknames of "Roachy", or  "Rooster", is a former Scotland international rugby league footballer who played as a  or  in the 1980s, 1990s and 2000s. He played at representative level for Scotland, and at club level for St Helens (Heritage № 1016), Swinton Lions (two spells), Castleford Tigers (Heritage № 738), Warrington Wolves, London Broncos and the Barrow Raiders.

Background
Jason Roach was born in St Helens, Lancashire, England.

International honours
Jason Roach won 8 caps for Scotland in 1998–2004 while at Warrington and Swinton. Scoring two tries on his début in Paris.

References

External links
(archived by web.archive.org) Statistics at thecastlefordtigers.co.uk
Profile at saints.org.uk
Statistics at wolvesplayers.thisiswarrington.co.uk

1971 births
Living people
Barrow Raiders players
Castleford Tigers players
English rugby league players
London Broncos players
Rugby league fullbacks
Rugby league players from St Helens, Merseyside
Rugby league wingers
Scotland national rugby league team players
St Helens R.F.C. players
Swinton Lions players
Warrington Wolves players